Sepoy Lines Constituency was a constituency in Singapore. It used to exist from 1959 to 1976, whereby it consists of Singapore General Hospital. Wee Toon Boon was a member of parliament for the constituency until 1976.

Member of Parliament

Elections

Elections in 1950s

Elections in the 1960s

Elections in the 1970s

References 

Singaporean electoral divisions
Outram, Singapore